Stephen or Steve Halliwell may refer to:

 Stephen Halliwell (academic) (born 1953), British classicist and academic
 Steve Halliwell (born 1946), English actor
 Steve Halliwell (rugby league) (born 1962), English born Australian rugby league footballer
 Steve Halliwell, keyboard player with Shriekback and King Swamp